The Australian one-dollar coin is the second most valuable circulation denomination coin of the Australian dollar after the two-dollar coin; there are also non-circulating legal-tender coins of higher denominations (five-, ten-, two-hundred-dollar coins and the one-million-dollar coin).

It was first issued on 14 May 1984 to replace the one-dollar note which was then in circulation, although plans to introduce a dollar coin had existed since the mid-1970s. The first year of minting saw 186.3 million of the coins produced at the Royal Australian Mint in Canberra.

Four portraits of Queen Elizabeth II have featured on the obverse, the 1984 head of Queen Elizabeth II by Arnold Machin; between 1985 and 1998, the head by Raphael Maklouf; between 1999 and 2009, the head by Ian Rank-Broadley; and since 2019, the effigy of Elizabeth II by artist Jody Clark has been released into circulation. The coin features an inscription on its obverse of AUSTRALIA on the right-hand side and ELIZABETH II on the left-hand side.

The reverse features five kangaroos. The image was designed by Stuart Devlin, who designed Australia's first decimal coins in 1966.

The one-dollar denomination was only issued in coin sets in 1987, 1989, 1990, 1991, 1992, and finally 2012. No one-dollar coin with any mint mark was ever released for circulation; any dollars found with such mark comes for a card.

$1 coins are legal tender for amounts not exceeding 10 times the face value of the coin for any payment of a debt.

Commemorative issue

The Royal Australian Mint has released a number of commemorative issued coins since the Australian $1 was released in 1984, some of which were not released into circulation.

See also

 Coins of the Australian dollar

References

Citations

Sources

External links
 Australian Decimal Currency
 The Australian Dollar Coin
 Australian Coins: Type Collecting
 Pictures of Australian Coins
 Coins from Australia / Coin Type: One Dollar - Online Coin Club

Currencies introduced in 1984
Decimal coins of Australia
One-base-unit coins